Hollenberg is a city in Washington County, Kansas, United States.  As of the 2020 census, the population of the city was 10.  It is located 1.5 miles south of the Nebraska state line.

History
Hollenberg was laid out in 1872. It was named for its founder, G. H. Hollenberg, who owned a store at the site.

The first post office in Hollenberg was established in April 1872.

Geography
Hollenberg is located at  (39.981217, -96.991233).

Demographics

2010 census
As of the census of 2010, there were 21 people, 12 households, and 4 families residing in the city. The racial makeup of the city was 90.5% White, 4.8% from other races, and 4.8% from two or more races. Hispanic or Latino of any race were 4.8% of the population.

There were 12 households, of which 8.3% had children under the age of 18 living with them, 33.3% were married couples living together, and 66.7% were non-families. 50.0% of all households were made up of individuals. The average household size was 1.75 and the average family size was 2.75.

The median age in the city was 55.3 years. 9.5% of residents were under the age of 18; 0.0% were between the ages of 18 and 24; 9.6% were from 25 to 44; 71.4% were from 45 to 64; and 9.5% were 65 years of age or older. The gender makeup of the city was 52.4% male and 47.6% female.

2000 census
As of the census of 2000, there were 31 people, 18 households, and 7 families residing in the city. The racial makeup of the city was 96.77% White, 3.23% from other races. Hispanic or Latino of any race were 3.23% of the population.

There were 18 households, out of which 16.7% had children under the age of 18 living with them, 27.8% were married couples living together, 5.6% had a female householder with no husband present, and 61.1% were non-families. 50.0% of all households were made up of individuals, and 11.1% had someone living alone who was 65 years of age or older. The average household size was 1.72 and the average family size was 2.43.

In the city, the population was spread out, with 12.9% under the age of 18, 3.2% from 18 to 24, 16.1% from 25 to 44, 48.4% from 45 to 64, and 19.4% who were 65 years of age or older. The median age was 52 years. For every 100 females, there were 106.7 males. For every 100 females age 18 and over, there were 125.0 males.

The median income for a household in the city was $11,667, and the median income for a family was $52,083. Males had a median income of $36,875 versus $16,250 for females. The per capita income for the city was $13,143. There were no families and 14.3% of the population living below the poverty line, including no under eighteens and 100.0% of those over 64.

Education
Hollenberg is served by USD 223 Barnes Hanover Linn.

Hollenberg High School was closed through school unification. The Hollenberg High School mascot was Pirates.

References

Further reading

External links
 Hollenberg - Directory of Public Officials
 USD 223, local school district
 Hollenberg city map, KDOT

Cities in Kansas
Cities in Washington County, Kansas